Chuck Wichgers (born July 4, 1965) is an American businessman and Republican politician from Waukesha County, Wisconsin.  He is a member of the Wisconsin State Assembly, representing the 82nd Assembly district since January 2023.  Prior to the 2022 redistricting, he represented the 83rd Assembly district for three terms (2017–2022).

Early life and education
Wichgers was born in Milwaukee, Wisconsin. He graduated from Muskego High School in 1983 and attended Waukesha County Technical College from 1984–1985.

Political career
Wichgers was a Waukesha County supervisor and alderman of Muskego (1999–2002). He was first elected to the Wisconsin State Assembly in 2016, from District 83.

In 2017, he sponsored a controversial bill that would allow chiropractors to give physicals to student athletes. (Under current Wisconsin law, only physicians and physician assistants may do so.) In 2021, he sponsored legislation to prohibit public schools from teaching students and employees about concepts such as systemic racism and implicit bias; the bill passed an Assembly committee on a party-line vote.

In March 2020, Wichgers opposed a Wisconsin Department of Health Services rule that seventh-grade students to receive the meningitis vaccine, a key protection against bacterial meningitis. The proposal was voted down on party lines in a committee vote. October 2020, amid a surge of COVID-19 cases in Wisconsin, Wichgers was one of several Wisconsin Republican legislators who attended an indoor mass gathering hosted by an anti-abortion organizations without wearing masks. In August 2021, Wichgers delivered a speech to anti-vaccine mandate protestors at the Wisconsin State Capitol, at which demonstrators likened COVID-19 vaccines to genocide and tyranny.

After Joe Biden defeated Donald Trump in the 2020 presidential election, Wichgers was one of 15 Wisconsin Republican legislators (joined by 76 Republican state legislators from other states) who attempted to subvert the election result and block Biden's victory. On January 5, 2021—one day before a violent pro-Trump mob attacked the Capitol—Wichgers signed a letter asking Vice President Mike Pence to delay the legally-mandated counting of the electoral votes for 10 days while they worked to convince Republican-controlled state legislators in key states won by Biden to overturn the election results, keeping Trump in power for another term. On July 25, 2022, Wichgers joined fellow Wisconsin Rep. Tim Ramthun's effort to pass a bill that would have the state legislature decertify its results from the 2020 presidential election and recall Wisconsin's 10 electoral votes, which went to Joe Biden.

References

External links
Official Assembly webpage

1965 births
Living people
Republican Party members of the Wisconsin State Assembly
County supervisors in Wisconsin
Wisconsin city council members
People from Muskego, Wisconsin
Politicians from Milwaukee
Waukesha County Technical College alumni
21st-century American politicians